Bernard Becker (August 21, 1920 – August 28, 2013) was an American professor emeritus of ophthalmology and visual sciences at Washington University School of Medicine in St. Louis. He was born in New York City.

Becker was internationally honored as an expert on the diagnosis and treatment of glaucoma and active in teaching and research. For more than 35 years, he led Washington University's department of ophthalmology.

In 1978, students, patients, and colleagues raised funds in his honor, which now endow two faculty positions: the Bernard and Janet Becker Professorship (presently held by Dr. Shiming Chen) and the Bernard Becker Professorship (presently held by Dr. Timothy McBride).

Early life and education
After graduating from medical school, he joined the United States Army during World War II and served as a military psychiatrist.

Death
Just a week after his 93rd birthday, Dr. Becker died from lung cancer at his home in the Central West End, St. Louis on August 28, 2013.

References

External links
 Washington University in St. Louis Alumni Magazine, 2002
 

1920 births
2013 deaths
American medical academics
American ophthalmologists
Deaths from lung cancer in Missouri
United States Army Medical Corps officers
United States Army personnel of World War II
 military psychiatrists
Washington University School of Medicine faculty